Richard Bell was a Scottish professional footballer who played as an inside forward in the Football League for Sunderland and West Ham United.

After a single appearance for Sunderland, Bell joined West Ham, then of the Second Division, and scored on his only League appearance for the club.

Bell signed up with the Essex Regiment of the Territorial Army in April 1939 and served with the Royal Artillery during World War II. He played as a wartime guest for Clapham and Southend United.

References

Scottish footballers
Scottish military personnel
Association football inside forwards
Port Glasgow Athletic Juniors F.C. players
Sunderland A.F.C. players
West Ham United F.C. players
English Football League players
Southend United F.C. wartime guest players
British Army personnel of World War II
Essex Regiment soldiers
Royal Artillery personnel
Place of death missing
Footballers from Greenock
Year of birth unknown
Year of death unknown